The third season of Bake Off Brasil premiered on August 12, 2017 at 9:30 p.m. on SBT.

This season marks the debut of Carol Fiorentino as the main host, replacing Ticiana Villas Boas, who left the show due to the leak of her husband's controversial bribery allegations with Brazil's president Michel Temer. Beca Milano replaced Fiorentino in the judging panel.

Bakers
The following is a list of contestants:

Results summary

Key
  Advanced
  Judges' favourite bakers
  Star Baker
  Eliminated
  Judges' bottom bakers
  Returned
  Runner-up
  Winner

Ratings and reception

Brazilian ratings
All numbers are in points and provided by Kantar Ibope Media.

References

External links 

 Bake Off Brasil on SBT

2017 Brazilian television seasons